Labrador Australian Football Club, also known as the Labrador Tigers, is a Gold Coast based sports club. Labrador's Australian rules football team currently competes in the Queensland Australian Football League. From 2011 to 2014 it was an inaugural member club of the NEAFL competition.

Formed in 1963 the Tigers played in the Gold Coast AFL until they were promoted into the Queensland State League in 1997. Runners-up in 2010 the club is a founding member of the NEAFL.

Premierships (7)

Club song
The Labrador Tigers have the same club song as that of the Richmond Tigers based on "Row, Row, Row".

Oh we're from Tigerland
A fighting fury, we're from Tigerland
In any weather you'll see us with a grin
Risking head and shin
If we're behind then never mind
We'll fight and fight and win
For we're from Tigerland.
We never weaken till the final siren's gone
Like the Tiger of old, we're strong and we're bold
For we're from Tiger – yellow and black – we're from Tigerland

Players in the AFL Draft

AFL players
There is a list of Labrador players who have played at AFL:
Claye Beams (Brisbane Lions)
Andrew Boston (Gold Coast)
Charlie Dixon (Gold Coast and Port Adelaide)
Jordan Doering (Carlton)
Cameron Ellis-Yolmen (Adelaide and Brisbane)
Peter Everitt (Hawthorn, St Kilda and Sydney)
Tom Fields (Carlton)
Ben Fixter (Sydney and Brisbane Lions)
Josh Fraser (Collingwood and Gold Coast)
Barry Hall (St Kilda, Sydney and Western Bulldogs)
Pearce Hanley (Brisbane Lions and Gold Coast)
Lachie Henderson (Brisbane Lions, Carlton and Geelong)
Trent Knobel (Brisbane Lions, St. Kilda and Richmond)
Matthew Lappin (Carlton and St Kilda)
Wayde Mills (Brisbane Lions)
Tim Notting (Brisbane Lions)
Michael Osborne (Hawthorn)
Bryce Retzlaff (Brisbane Lions)
Aaron Shattock (Brisbane Lions and Port Adelaide)
Daniel Stewart (Port Adelaide)
Stephen Wrigley (Brisbane Lions)

References

External links

 Official website

Labrador
1964 establishments in Australia
Australian rules football clubs established in 1964
Australian rules football teams on the Gold Coast, Queensland